Teelba is a rural locality in the Maranoa Region, Queensland, Australia. In the  Teelba had a population of 44 people.

Geography 
Teelba is a watershed. In the north of the locality, Murilla Creek flows north into the Condamine River drainage basin, while in the south the Teelba Creek flows south into the Moonie River drainage basin.

History 
Teelba Creek State School opened on 5 July 1965, but was renamed Teelba State School on 24 September 1965.

In the  Teelba had a population of 44 people.

Education 
Teelba State School is a government primary (Prep-6) school for boys and girls at Teelba Road just north of the crossing of Teelba Creek..
In 2016, the school had an enrolment of 23 students with 3 teachers (2 full-time equivalent) and 5 non-teaching staff (2 full-time equivalent).
In 2018, the school had an enrolment of 25 students with 3 teachers (2 full-time equivalent) and 5 non-teaching staff (2 full-time equivalent).

References 

Maranoa Region
Localities in Queensland